John Peile  (24 April 1838 – 9 October 1910) was an English philologist.

Life
He was born at Whitehaven, the son of geologist Williamson Peile, F.G.S., who died when his son was five years old.

He was educated at Repton (under the headmastership of his uncle, Thomas Williamson Peile, father of Sir James Braithwaite Peile), St. Bees School and Christ's College, Cambridge. After a distinguished career (Craven Scholar, Senior Classic and First Chancellor's Medallist), he became Fellow and Tutor of his college, Reader of Comparative Philology in the university (1884-1891), and in 1887 was elected Master of Christ's. He took a great interest in the higher education of women and became president of Newnham College. He was the first to introduce the great philological works of Georg Curtius and Wilhelm Corssen to the English student in his Introduction to Greek and Latin Etymology (1869). He died at Cambridge in October 1910, leaving practically completed his exhaustive history of Christ's College (publ. 1913).

Selected publications

References

Sources

1838 births
1910 deaths
Alumni of Christ's College, Cambridge
Masters of Christ's College, Cambridge
Fellows of Newnham College, Cambridge
People educated at Repton School
People educated at St Bees School
Vice-Chancellors of the University of Cambridge
English philologists
Fellows of the British Academy